Aleksandr Artyomovich  Adabashyan  (born August 10, 1945, Moscow) is Soviet and Russian film writer, artist, director and actor. Honored Artist of the RSFSR (1983). Honored Artist of Russia (2016).

Biography 
Born in Moscow into a russified Armenian family of Artyom Adabashyan, an official at the Ministry of Construction Industry, and Valentina Barkhudarova, a teacher of German language. According to Aleksandr, he was raised inside the Russian culture, he doesn't speak Armenian language and he visited Yerevan only twice in his life. In 1962 he enrolled in the Stroganov Moscow State University of Arts and Industry, and in 1964 he went to serve in the army. In three years he returned and finished the art courses.

As a student he got acquainted with Nikita Mikhalkov and participated in his diploma film A Quite Day at the End of the War as a decorator. After that he turned into a regular Mikhalkov's collaborator, taking part in the majority of his movies as an art director, artist, screenwriter and actor (usually appearing in episodic roles). He also constantly worked with other film directors such as Georgiy Daneliya, Andrei Konchalovsky, Sergei Solovyov and Dunya Smirnova.

He directed two movies on his own: Mado, poste restante (which was nominated for the 1991 César Award as the best debut work) and Azazel mini-series, the first adaptation of Erast Fandorin's adventures. In addition, he made a career as a comedy actor, most famously portraying Barrymore in The Hound of the Baskervilles Soviet adaptation, also alongside Nikita Mikhalkov (who played Sir Henry Baskerville). Among his other notable roles is Timofeev in Five Evenings and  Berlioz in The Master and Margarita.

Between 1997 and 1998 Adabashyan directed two operas: Boris Godunov for the Mariinsky Theatre and Khovanshchina for the La Scala opera house. He also worked as an interior designer in several Moscow restaurants.

Adabashyan has been married twice. His first wife was Marina Lebesheva, the sister of the acclaimed Russian cinematographer Pavel Lebeshev. His second wife is Ekaterina Shadrina, an assistant costume designer who also appeared in a small role in Mikhalkov's At Home Among Strangers. Together they have two daughters.

Awards
 1978 — Laureate of the State Prize of the Kazakh SSR Kulyash Baiseitova
 1983 — Honored Painter  of the RSFSR
 1990 — Youth Jury Prize International Film Festival  Cinema Europe  in Ravenna for the movie  Mado, poste restante 
 1991 — Nominated for the César Award for best debut work (the movie  Mado, poste restante)
 1991 — Prize Flayyano Silver Pegasus  (Italy   for best foreign scenario)
 1993 — Fellini Prize for Best European scenario 
 2006 — Award VII Russian Festival comedy  Smile, Russia!    for the contribution to comedy
 2013 — Special Jury Prize    Film Festival  Window to Europe in Vyborg (the film  Dog Heaven)
 2014 — Nominees for the Golden Eagle Award for Best Script (the film Dog Heaven)

Selected filmography

References

External links

1945 births
Russian people of Armenian descent
Soviet male actors
Russian male actors
Soviet screenwriters
20th-century Russian screenwriters
20th-century Russian male writers
Male screenwriters
Recipients of the Medal of the Order "For Merit to the Fatherland" I class
Academic staff of High Courses for Scriptwriters and Film Directors
Soviet film directors
Russian film directors
Living people
Writers from Moscow
Male actors from Moscow
Stroganov Moscow State Academy of Arts and Industry alumni